David Jung is the founder and CEO of Hero Poker, which was an online poker room. Before founding Hero Poker, he was the Regional Marketing Director of PokerStars Asia from late 2008 until early 2010.

References

Living people
Place of birth missing (living people)
South Korean businesspeople
Year of birth missing (living people)